The Ode is a 2008 film directed by Nilanjan Neil Lahiri and starring Sachin Bhatt, Wilson Cruz and Sakina Jaffrey. The film is an adaptation of the novel, Ode to Lata<ref>[https://www.publishersweekly.com/978-1-893329-13-3 Publishers Weekly: ODE TO LATA - Ghalib Shiraz Dhalla, Author ]</ref> by Ghalib Shiraz Dhalla.DNA India: Shah goes global with 'Ode' to Hollywood The biopic was shot on location in Kenya and in Los Angeles and produced by Ratna Maity, with Bharat Shah as executive producer. The film marks the acting debut of Indian actress, Manchu Lakshmi.

Ode to Lata
The film is an adaptation of the book Ode to Lata written by Ghalib Shiraz Dhalla.Los Angeles Times: Song of Himself (review) It was a critically acclaimed debut novel for the author published in 2002. It provides an insight into an often maligned realm of LGBT life through its focus on racial diversity on the scene. Los Angeles Times Book Review called it "An achievement... This story resonates for any and all of us. A book of healing, of a soul coming to terms with itself and the body and mind it inhabits". A 10th anniversary edition was published in November 2012.

Synopsis
The storyline spans two generations of Indians. There is the doomed but passionate love story of Parin (Sakina Jaffrey) and Shiraz (Anil Kumar). This is intertwined with the life of their gay son Ali (Sachin Bhatt) who discovers that the past is always present no matter how far you run from it. Ali flees to Hollywood, away from his overprotective mother and the memories of his father's violent death.

A successful banker by day, at night Ali's life unravels in a blur of alcohol, drugs, and sex as he grapples with love, loss and ultimately, forgiveness. When his mother comes to Los Angeles to visit Ali in a last-ditch attempt to bring him back home and change his ways, the trapdoors of the past are flung open. Through Ali's struggle to break free and in his obsessive relationship with Richard (Diego Serrano), we glimpse into a troubled past he cannot escape and which threatens to destroy him unless he finds peace with his mother.

Cast
Sachin Bhatt as Ali
Wilson Cruz as Adrian
Sakina Jaffrey as Parin
Parvesh Cheena as Salman
Diego Serrano as Richard
Rebecca Hazlewood as Young Parin
Philip Anthony-Rodriguez as Nelson
Lakshmi Manchu as Najma
Enrique Almeida as Cholo (1)
Noel Gugliemi as Cholo (2)
Ajay Mehta as Mr. Surani
Anoush NeVart as Mrs. Surani (credited as Anna NeVart)
Yasmine Delawari as Guli
Anil Kumar as Shiraz

ScreeningsThe Ode'' premiered at the Outfest Film Festival on July 17, 2008 to a sold-out audience.

References

External links

The Ode – film page on vimeo.com

2008 films
American LGBT-related films
Films set in Kenya
2000s English-language films
2000s American films